Cheryll Toney Holley is a First Nations American historian, genealogist, and museum director. She serves as the chief of the Hassanamisco Nipmuc, part of the Nipmuc Nation, a Massachusetts state-recognized tribe.

Career 
She was selected to succeed Chief Walter Vickers after his resignation in July 2013. As chief, Holley's duties range from spiritual advice to job placement assistance. Holley is the tribe's third female chief in the past fifty years. Furthermore, Holley is one of the five founding members of the Nipmuc Women’s Health Coalition. The coalition is run by a group of Native American women advocating for culturally appropriate health care programs for Nipmucs.

She is a co-founder and the director of the Nipmuc Indian Development Corporation, which is a Native Community Development Corporation. She is also the director of the Hassanamisco Indian Museum in Grafton, Massachusetts.

Prior to her election in 2013, Holley was the clinical supervisor of the dermatology clinic at UMass Memorial Medical center. Between 1998 and 2008, she served on the Massachusetts Commission on Indian Affairs. In her role as proprietor of PastTense Genealogy, she works to connect New England’s descendants of communities of color in her role as proprietor of PastTense Genealogy.

Public speaking
Holley is a historian specializing in Native American and African American genealogies.

In June 2014, she participated in a panel discussion of Massachusetts tribal leaders at Boston’s Suffolk University entitled, “A Hidden History: How Massachusetts Law and Policy Facilitated the Loss of Tribal Lands.” She described the vast land dispossession at the end of the seventeenth century where the majority of Hassanamesit Nipmuc reservation land was sold to European colonists. Today, only three acres remain of the original Hassanamesit reservation in Grafton, Massachusetts. In March 2015, Holley participated in another conversation with tribal leaders at the University of Massachusetts, Amherst, on the topic of challenges with repatriation work in efforts to properly rebury tribal members.  In April 2015, Holley spoke at the 13th New England Regional Genealogical Conference in Providence, Rhode Island. She discussed how New England’s waterways served as highways between tribes, fostering intertribal connections that still exist today.

Historical writing
 What It Means to Be Native American Indian in New England Today: A Personal View (Old Sturbridge Village, 2002) 
 For All My Relations: Dedicated to New England's Communities of Color (Cheryll Toney Holley's blog, 2010–11) 
 Letter in support of federal recognition (September 2014)
 A Brief Look at Nipmuc History.  Reprinted in Dawnland Voices: An Anthology of Writing from Indigenous New England, ed. Siobhan Senier (University of Nebraska Press, 2014): 404-10.

References

External links 
 Cheryll Toney Holley, personal website

American women historians
Female Native American leaders
Native American activists
Native American women in politics
Native American women writers
Nipmuc
Native American people from Massachusetts
20th-century Native American women
20th-century Native Americans
21st-century Native American women
21st-century Native Americans
21st-century American historians
21st-century American women writers